Lies They Tell Our Children (stylized in all caps) is the thirteenth studio album by American punk rock band Anti-Flag from Pittsburgh, Pennsylvania. It was released on January 6, 2023, via Spinefarm Records. Primary production, recording, and mastering was handled by Jon Lundin at A-F Records. It is also the band's first concept album, and features multiple guest musicians from notable acts such as Rise Against, Bad Religion, Bad Cop/Bad Cop, Pinkshift, and Silverstein.

Background 
Following the release of their previous album, 20/20 Vision, Anti-Flag was forced to put their touring schedule on hold due to the COVID-19 pandemic. This allowed the band to spend much more time than usual on writing and recording their next album. Unlike their previous albums, Lies They Tell Our Children is the band's first concept album that looks at various anti-war, climate devastation, and racism topics, but attempts to go back to the sources of these issues and understand how they came to be.

The album also features a large number of guest musicians that range from friends of the band to different music genres and political perspectives.

Release and reception 

The majority of songs from Lies They Tell Our Children were released ahead of the album. Alongside the announcement of the album, the band also released its first single, "Laugh. Cry. Smile. Die.", along with a corresponding music on July 29, 2022. This was followed by five additional singles, all of which featured a guest musician.

In support of the album, the band also embarked on a North American tour ahead of its release, beginning in Burlington, Vermont on September 16, 2022.

Gavin Brown of Distorted Sound called the album "an urgent and supremely well-executed collection of rousing anthems that perfectly encapsulates the rage at the problems that we as a world have faced in recent times". John Longbottom of Kerrang! called it "a truly great and timely album from a band who continue to fearlessly, articulately and aggressively address the issues of the here and now".

Track listing
Notes

 All songs titles are stylized in all caps.

Personnel 

Anti-Flag
Justin Sane – guitar, vocals
Chris Head – guitar, vocals
Chris Barker – bass, vocals
Pat Thetic – drums

Featured artists
Jesse Leach – vocals on "Modern Meta Medicine"
Shane Told – vocals on "Laugh. Cry. Smile. Die"
Tim McIlrath – vocals on "The Fight of Our Lives"
Brian Baker – guitar on "The Fight of Our Lives"
Ashrita Kumar – vocals on "Imperialism"
Campino – vocals "Victory or Death (We Gave 'Em Hell)"
Tré Burt – vocals on "Shallow Graves"
Stacy Dee – vocals on "Nvrevr"

Production
Jon Lundin – producer, recording and mixing
Mass Giorgini – mastering
Tom Zwanzger – engineering
Arnaud Bascunana – engineering
Vincent Sorg – engineering
Justin Francis – engineering

Artwork
Doug Dean – artwork, design and concept

Charts

References

2023 albums
Anti-Flag albums
Spinefarm Records albums